eJay is a series of musical arrangement software, and video games, primarily for Microsoft Windows. The first edition, Dance eJay, was released in 1997. It supports eight tracks of audio and, as with its successors, permits the arrangement of sound bites by a drag-and-drop interface. Since the original Dance eJay, there have been many releases catering to different music genres and users, including techno and hip-hop, as well as a PlayStation 2 edition called eJay Clubworld.

In the PlayStation 2 edition, there are genres of music to choose from which are actually dedicated to a club in a particular real world location (hence the subtitle Clubworld) that plays that particular genre of music, for example in Brooklyn, New York City, New York, United States, the club would be called Brooklyn and the club would play hip hop music, in actuality, New York is where hip hop music was born, but in another Borough of the city called Bronxville (The Bronx) and the player would make and play back hip hop music should the player select the club/genre. 

In May 2009, a note posted to eJay's official Facebook page stated that Empire Interactive Europe Limited, the company that owned and developed the eJay products, was in administration.

On 15 October 2010, three eJay products were reissued in editions: Hip Hop 5, Dance 6 and DJ Mixstation 4, with Hip Hop 5 and Dance 6 now having twice the number of sound samples than they had originally (10,000 instead of 5,000). Also on the same date, a new software called Video & Music Exchange was released.

Currently eJay is a registered trademark of Yelsi AG.

External links
 Complete series listing at Giantbomb

References

1997 video games
Crave Entertainment games
Audio mixing software
Music video games
PlayStation 2 games
Turntable video games
Video games developed in Sweden
Windows games